The Ceratizit Challenge by La Vuelta (La Madrid Challenge by La Vuelta before 2020) is an elite women's professional bicycle race held in Spain, and has been part of the UCI Women's WorldTour since 2016. Similar to La Course by Le Tour de France, the race has traditionally coincided with the final day of the Vuelta a España.

The race was first held as a one-day road race in the centre of Madrid from 2015. From 2018 onwards, a time trial was held as a first stage, albeit within the Madrid region. 

In 2020, a third day of racing was added and the race was renamed as the Ceratizit Challenge by La Vuelta - after sponsor Ceratizit, and as stages were held outside the borders of the Autonomous Community of Madrid. The 2021 edition increased the number of stages to 4, with the race finishing in Santiago de Compostela. The 2022 edition will have 5 stages, from Marina de Cudeyo in the northern Cantabria region to Madrid - with the final day of the race coinciding with the final day of the 2022 Vuelta a España. 

The 2023 edition will move to May, increase further to 7 days and be renamed 'La Vuelta Femenina', becoming the third Major Tour for professional women following the Giro d'Italia Donne and the Tour de France Femmes.

Winners

References

See also
 La Course by Le Tour de France

Cycle races in Spain
Women's road bicycle races
UCI Women's World Tour races